Mount Tahan, is the highest point in Peninsular Malaysia with an elevation of  above sea level, on the border between the states of Pahang and Kelantan, with the peak lies on the Pahangese side. It is part of the Taman Negara that straddles Jerantut District in Pahang, Gua Musang District in Kelantan and Hulu Terengganu District in Terengganu. The mountain is part of the Tahan Range in the Tenasserim Hills and is popular with local climbers.

Gunung Tahan is considered by many to be one of the toughest treks in Peninsular Malaysia.

Trails

There are three trails to the summit, commonly referred to as:

 Kuala Tahan-Kuala Tahan
 Merapoh-Kuala Tahan or Kuala Tahan-Merapoh
 Merapoh-Merapoh

The Kuala Tahan classic trail is the oldest and most scenic trail. A return trip on this trail typically takes seven days. Climbers have to trek across undulating ridges and make several river crossings before finally reaching the foot of the mountain to make the final ascent. Climbers without adequate physical fitness or training are not advised to attempt Gunung Tahan.

The other two trails are from Merapoh (Sungai Relau). The Merapoh-Merapoh trail is significantly shorter than the other two. A return trip on the Merapoh trail takes 3–4 days. A traverse from Kuala Tahan to Merapoh (or the other way around) takes around 5 days.

Temperature
Mount Tahan can be very cold at night. Temperatures can range from 4 °C to 18 °C between December and January, and 7 °C to 27 °C between June and September. Frost can sometimes appear at the summit.

Gallery

See also
List of mountains in Malaysia
List of Southeast Asian mountains
List of Ultras of Southeast Asia

References

External links

 "Gunung Tahan, Malaysia" on Peakbagger

Tahan
Tahan
Tourist attractions in Pahang